Twelve Mile Road is a 2003 American drama television film written and directed by Richard Friedenberg, based on the 1994 novel Mystery Ride by Robert Boswell. The film stars Tom Selleck, Wendy Crewson, Maggie Grace, Anna Gunn, and Patrick Flueger. The story is set in Idaho and follows the challenging relationship between a man and his estranged daughter as they reunite and attempt to work out their complicated family issues. It aired on CBS on September 28, 2003.

Plot
After a rough divorce, farmer Stephen Landis lives a normal life living on his ranch in Idaho with his girlfriend Leah and her daughter, Roxanne. But life once again gets complicated for Stephen when his daughter Dulcie comes for a summer visit after having a fight with her mother. Stephen's absence as a father and failed marriage with Angela left Dulcie in a rebellious state as a troubled teenager. Stephen's ex-wife attempts to warn him of their daughter's disruptive behaviors, but combined with his feelings of guilt, the relationship threatens to ruin his present relationship and life with Leah. Dulcie and her father try to begin to heal their problems, but the damage may be too great to resolve and jeopardizes the chance of a bright future for either of them.

Cast
 Tom Selleck as Stephen Landis
 Wendy Crewson as Angela Landis
 Maggie Grace as Dulcie Landis
 Anna Gunn as Leah O'Dell
 Patrick Flueger as Will Coffey
 Tegan Moss as Roxanne O'Dell
 Tim Henry as Aza Coffey
 Beverley Breuer as Henrietta Coffey
 Dan Petronijevic as Tony
 Jenna Friedenberg as Dawn
 Hamish Boyd as Reverend Loemer

Production
Filming took place in Calgary, including at CFB West Studios.

Awards and nominations

References

External links
 

2003 films
2003 drama films
2000s American films
2000s English-language films
American drama television films
CBS network films
Films about father–daughter relationships
Films based on American novels
Films directed by Richard Friedenberg
Films scored by Jeff Beal
Films set on farms
Films set in Idaho
Films shot in Calgary
Television films based on books